Tunisia, took part at the 1973 All-Africa Games held in Lagos, Nigeria. She won 63 medals.

Medal summary

Medal table

See also
 Tunisia at the All-Africa Games

References

1973 All-Africa Games
1973
1973 in Tunisian sport